James Bridges (1936–1993) was an American screenwriter and film director.

James Bridges may also refer to:

James Bridges (architect) (1725–1763), English architect and civil engineer
James Whiteside Bridges (1863–1930), head of the Canadian military medical service
Jimmy Bridges (1887–1966), English cricketer
Jimmy Bridges (actor) (born 1960), American actor
Jim Bridges (born 1951), American bobsledder

See also
James Brydges (disambiguation)